Lawrence Jr. Garron (May 23, 1937 – September 13, 2019) was an American professional football player.  A fullback, he played college football at Western Illinois University, then played professionally in the American Football League (AFL) for the Boston Patriots from 1960 through 1968.  He holds the team record run of 85 yards from scrimmage, set in a game against the Buffalo Bills on October 22, 1961.  He averaged 5.9 yards per carry in 1962 and accounted for 1,168 total yards from scrimmage in 1963.  

Garron was an American Football League All-Star in 1961, 1963, 1964 and 1967, and a member of the Patriots' All-1960s (AFL) Team.

For one season, along with Bob Fouracre, he served as a color commentator for New England Patriots preseason games.

At the same time Larry Garron was on the Patriots he studied various forms of martial arts. He held ranks in Kenpō (fist law), Hakkō-ryū Jujutsu, Gōjū-ryū (hard soft system), Shintō Musō-ryū, Yoshitsune Jujitsu, and Taekwondo.

Larry had some talented sporting sons and nephews, including nephew Donald Garron, who won the 1981 Massachusetts All State 220 yard championship in 22.37, as well as Rufus Harris, who had a tryout with the Boston Celtics in 1980.  Two of his sons, Arnold and Andre, are in the Hall of Fame for American football at the University of New Hampshire. Andre also played professionally for the Kansas City Chiefs as a running back and kick returner for two seasons in the late 1980s.

See also
 List of American Football League players

References

1937 births
2019 deaths
American football fullbacks
Boston Patriots players
National Football League announcers
New England Patriots announcers
Western Illinois Leathernecks football players
American Football League All-Star players
People from Quitman County, Mississippi
People from Framingham, Massachusetts
American Football League players
Players of American football from Mississippi